Bilat Paswan, who wrote under the pen name Vihangam, was an Indian writer and politician, known for his writings in Hindi & Maithili literature. He was a former chairman of Bihar Public Service Commission & former chairman of Bihar Inter University Board. Born in 1940 to Bhutai Paswan in Bihar, he represented Rajnagar (Vidhan Sabha constituency) at the Bihar Legislative Assembly for two terms in 1968 and 1972 & Khajauli (Vidhan Sabha constituency) at the Bihar Legislative Assembly for two terms in 1985 and 1990, contesting under Indian National Congress candidature, defeating Ram Lakhan Ram of the Communist Party of India on both the elections. He also contested two elections unsuccessfully, in 1980 and 2000. The Government of India awarded him the fourth highest civilian honour of the Padma Shri, in 2005, for his contributions to literature.

See also 
 Maithili literature

References

External links 
 

1940 births
2017 deaths
Recipients of the Padma Shri in literature & education
Writers from Bihar
Maithili writers
Indian National Congress politicians from Bihar
Bihar MLAs 1985–1990
Pseudonymous writers
Bihar MLAs 1990–1995